North Mahoning Township is a township in Indiana County, Pennsylvania, United States. The population was 1,349 at the 2020 census. Some historic communities include Covode (previously called Kellysville), Marchand, and Trade City (previously Davidsville).

Geography
According to the United States Census Bureau, the township has a total area of 28.3 square miles (73.3 km2), all  land.

Demographics

As of the census of 2000, there were 1,383 people, 464 households, and 368 families residing in the township.  The population density was 48.8 people per square mile (18.9/km2).  There were 522 housing units at an average density of 18.4/sq mi (7.1/km2).  The racial makeup of the township was 98.63% White, 0.29% African American, and 1.08% from two or more races. Hispanic or Latino of any race were 0.07% of the population.

There were 464 households, out of which 36.6% had children under the age of 18 living with them, 70.5% were married couples living together, 4.3% had a female householder with no husband present, and 20.5% were non-families. 18.5% of all households were made up of individuals, and 9.9% had someone living alone who was 65 years of age or older.  The average household size was 2.94 and the average family size was 3.37.

In the township the population was spread out, with 29.6% under the age of 18, 8.6% from 18 to 24, 26.5% from 25 to 44, 22.1% from 45 to 64, and 13.2% who were 65 years of age or older.  The median age was 36 years. For every 100 females there were 102.2 males.  For every 100 females age 18 and over, there were 99.4 males.

The median income for a household in the township was $31,250, and the median income for a family was $35,109. Males had a median income of $28,125 versus $17,132 for females. The per capita income for the township was $12,365.  About 14.1% of families and 16.9% of the population were below the poverty line, including 24.8% of those under age 18 and 16.8% of those age 65 or over.

References

Townships in Indiana County, Pennsylvania
Townships in Pennsylvania